The following is family tree of the Malay monarchs of Singapura-Melaka, from the establishment of Kingdom of Singapura in 1299 until the fall of Melaka Sultanate in 1511.

References

Singapura-Melakan